The 1975–76 AHL season was the 40th season of the American Hockey League. The league begins to give out three James H. Ellery Memorial Awards to the media, one each for outstanding newspaper, radio and television coverage of the AHL.

Eight teams played 76 games each in the schedule. The Nova Scotia Voyageurs finished first overall in the regular season, and won their second Calder Cup championship.

Team changes
 The Syracuse Eagles cease operations.
 The Virginia Wings cease operations.
 The Baltimore Clippers resume operations.
 The New Haven Nighthawks switch divisions from North to South.

Final standings
Note: GP = Games played; W = Wins; L = Losses; T = Ties; GF = Goals for; GA = Goals against; Pts = Points;

Scoring leaders

Note: GP = Games played; G = Goals; A = Assists; Pts = Points; PIM = Penalty minutes

 complete list

Calder Cup playoffs

Trophy and award winners
Team awards

Individual awards

Other awards

See also
List of AHL seasons

References
AHL official site
AHL Hall of Fame
HockeyDB

 
American Hockey League seasons
3
3